Chor Machaye Shor  is a Pakistani Urdu language film directed by Syed Noor. The film stars Babar Ali, Resham, and Sahiba Afzal. The film was released on 22 March 1996.

It is a re-make of the 1980 Punjabi film Sohra te Jawai.

Cast
 Reema Khan
 Babar Ali
 Jan Rambo
 Saud
 Sahiba Afzal
 Resham
 Ali Ejaz

Songs
Film song lyrics were written by Riaz ur Rehman Saghar and Saeed Gillani, music was by M. Arshad
Ghari Raat Ka Eik Bajaye Aur Janu Ghar Na Aye sung by Shazia Manzoor, Saira Nasim
Banno Hamari Anmol, Sajao Doli Dholak Baja Ke sung by Shazia Manzoor, Saira Nasim and others.

Awards
 Nigar Award for Best Female Playback Singer for this film in 1996.

References

External links

1996 films
Pakistani romantic comedy-drama films
1990s Urdu-language films
Remakes of Pakistani films
Films directed by Syed Noor
Nigar Award winners
Urdu-language Pakistani films